Aluan Ricciardi (born 26 October 1987 in Vera Cruz, Bahia, Brazil) is a French snowboarder. He placed fifteenth in the men's halfpipe event at the 2010 Winter Olympics.

References

External links 
 
 
 
 

1987 births
Living people
French male snowboarders
Olympic snowboarders of France
Snowboarders at the 2010 Winter Olympics
X Games athletes
21st-century French people